Snug is a small coastal town on the Channel Highway located  south of Hobart in Tasmania, Australia. Snug is a part of the Municipality of Kingborough, but with about 7% in the Huon Valley Council LGA. Snug is also part of the Greater Hobart statistical area.

Location and features
Snug is residential location for individuals working in Kingborough, and has a small tourism industry. It features two churches, the Snug Primary School, General Store, butcher, pub, a community hall, oval and soccer clubrooms, the 1967 Tasmanian Bushfire Memorial, caravan park, nursery and the Snug Village retirement home. A monthly market has been held in the town for the last 9 years.

History
The area around Snug was first encountered by Europeans when Rear Admiral Bruni D'Entrecasteaux sailed up the nearby channel. Following the establishment of a colony at Hobart Town, the Snug River was found and named reflecting the "snug and agreeable seclusion" of the inlet. By the 1820s a port and sawmilling facilities had become established at nearby North-West Bay. Subsequently, around the 1840s and 1850s, a small settlement was established at Snug itself.

Snug River Post Office opened on 1 October 1870 and was renamed Snug in 1908.

Around 1908, James Gillies began negotiations with the State government to permit the construction of a hydroelectric power scheme at Tasmania's Great Lake, for the purpose of providing power for his newly patented zinc smelting process and a "carbide" factory. Construction of the "carbide" factory commenced in the vicinity of Snug in 1917, and shortly after the end of World War One the Electrona Carbide Works began production of "carbide" (calcium carbide) using lime (from limestone), coke and electric arc furnaces. The carbide was used in the manufacture of acetylene gas. Gillies was unable to obtain sufficient liquidity to finish all of his planned electrification projects, and on the verge of bankruptcy he lost control of the hydroelectric scheme to a State Government department formed for the purpose of rescuing his scheme: the Hydro Electric Department, which later became the Hydro Electric Commission, and now Hydro Tasmania. (The zinc smelter project was abandoned but later taken up again by another company and is currently operated by Zinifex at Lutana.) In 1924 Gillies went into receivership and the Carbide Works was taken over by "the Hydro", and later by Electrona Carbide Industries, who continued to operate it as such into the 1980s.

With falling demand for carbide, and suffering multimillion-dollar losses from plant failure in 1979, the carbide smelter was sold to Pioneer Silicon Industries. This company converted it to a silicon smelter with a theoretical capacity of 10,000 tonnes/yr, and produced metallurgical grade silicon "metal" from 1988. However, it was never able to make a profit and in August 1991, the plant was finally closed.

The town had a football team that played in the Kingsborough Football Association. It won premierships in 1954, 1956 and 1957. During the 1967 Tasmanian bushfires the town of Snug was devastated, two-thirds of the town's houses were destroyed, along with two churches and half the school. Eleven people lost their lives. The local football team was forced to merge with other local clubs to become the Channel Football Club.

See also

 List of localities in Tasmania

References

Towns in Tasmania
Southern Tasmania
Localities of Kingborough Council
Localities of Huon Valley Council
Suburbs of Hobart
Localities of City of Hobart